The Beaver Dam River is a  tributary of the Crawfish River in south-central Wisconsin in the United States.  Via the Crawfish and Rock rivers, it is part of the Mississippi River watershed.

Course
The river's entire length is in Dodge County.  It flows from Beaver Dam Lake at the city of Beaver Dam and follows a generally southward course, passing the village of Lowell before joining the Crawfish River at Mud Lake in the town of Shields.

See also
List of Wisconsin rivers

References

Rivers of Dodge County, Wisconsin
Rivers of Wisconsin
Tributaries of the Mississippi River